The Holland Range is a rugged coastal mountain range in Antarctica, about  long, lying just west of the Ross Ice Shelf and extending from Robb Glacier to Lennox-King Glacier. It was named by the Ross Sea Committee for Sir Sidney Holland, who as Prime Minister of New Zealand supported that nation's participation in the Commonwealth Trans-Antarctic Expedition (1956–58).

References

Mountain ranges of the Ross Dependency
Shackleton Coast